Jack Emanuel "Soupy" Shapiro (March 22, 1907 – February 5, 2001) was an American gridiron football player who played in one game with the Staten Island Stapletons of the National Football League (NFL) in 1929.

Early life
In 1907, Shapiro was born in New York City, New York, United States, North America. His parents had immigrated to the United States with their previous four boys and three girls, as well as their niece. Jack was the only one of his family to be born in America. His father and two of his brothers did odd jobs for a living, resulting in earnings of $9.00 a week.

Shapiro attended Evander Child High School in the Bronx. While in high school, he was a starter on the football team for three straight years. During the last game in his senior year, however, he was injured and was forced out of the game.

College career
Prior to joining the Stapletons, Shapiro played college football, while attending New York University. He played fullback for the Violets in 1927 when the team posted a 7-1-2 record while outscoring their opponents by 345-65. He joined the NYU team his freshman year as a "walk on". By his sophomore year, he was given a full scholarship and was awarded a varsity letterman that season.

Afterwards, Shapiro moonlighted as a professional football player for a team in Meriden, Connecticut. The team was sponsored by the Sons of Italy.

NFL
In 1929, Shapiro played in one NFL game with Staten Island. As the shortest player in the history of the NFL, Shapiro played as a blocking back in the Stapletons' 34-0 victory over the Minneapolis Red Jackets. Shapiro later stated that he was, in fact, on the Stapletons roster for five games, playing in two regular-season games and one exhibition game. The regular-season games were late in the season against the Minneapolis Red Jackets and Orange Tornadoes.

Recognition
In 1999, Shapiro received recognition in the Guinness Book of Records as being the shortest player on record in NFL history.

References

Bibliography
Jews in Sports profile

Jack Shapiro's obituary

1907 births
2001 deaths
Jewish American sportspeople
Players of American football from New York (state)
NYU Violets football players
Staten Island Stapletons players
20th-century American Jews